Colonel Charles Wesley Weldon McLean,  & Two Bars (August 1882 – 5 September 1962) was a Canadian soldier and politician.

Early life
McLean was born in Saint John, New Brunswick in 1882. His father, Brigadier General Hugh Havelock McLean, was a lawyer and politician who served as Lieutenant-Governor of New Brunswick, Canada from 1928 to 1933. He was educated at the Royal Military College of Canada in Kingston, Ontario from 1897 to 1899.

Career
McLean began his military career as a lieutenant in the Canadian Non-Permanent Active Militia, and on 7 March 1900 received a commission in the British Army as a second lieutenant in the Royal Artillery. He saw active service in the Second Boer War in South Africa from 1899 to 1901. During World War I, Major McLean commanded the 52 Brigade Royal Horse Artillery, 9th Scottish Division, British Army. He was awarded a Distinguished Service Order (DSO) in 1915, a bar in 1917 "for conspicuous gallantry and devotion to duty. He has commanded his battery with great skill and courage. He has observed fire and commanded the battery from an observation post under heavy fire with great coolness and accuracy." and a second bar in the same gazette.

He remained in England after the War. Standing as a Coalition Conservative, he was elected at the 1918 general election as the member of parliament (MP) for the Brigg division of Lincolnshire,
but did not stand again at the 1922 general election.

Correspondence related to his service in artillery and as MP are in the Imperial War Museum, Department of Documents. He died in 1962 aged 80.

References

Books
4237 Dr. Adrian Preston & Peter Dennis (Edited) "Swords and Covenants" Rowman And Littlefield, London. Croom Helm. 1976.
H16511 Dr. Richard Arthur Preston "To Serve Canada: A History of the Royal Military College of Canada" 1997 Toronto, University of Toronto Press, 1969.
H16511 Dr. Richard Arthur Preston "Canada's RMC – A History of Royal Military College" Second Edition 1982
H16511 Dr. Richard Preston "R.M.C. and Kingston: The effect of imperial and military influences on a Canadian community" 1968
H1877 R. Guy C. Smith (editor) "As You Were! Ex-Cadets Remember". In 2 Volumes. Volume I: 1876–1918. Volume II: 1919–1984. Royal Military College. [Kingston]. The R.M.C. Club of Canada. 1984

External links 

1882 births
1962 deaths
British Army personnel of the Second Boer War
British Army personnel of World War I
Canadian Militia officers
Canadian expatriates in England
Companions of the Distinguished Service Order
Conservative Party (UK) MPs for English constituencies
Royal Artillery officers
Royal Military College of Canada alumni
UK MPs 1918–1922